This is a list of the European Music & Media magazine's European Hot 100 Singles and European Top 100 Albums number-ones of 1989.

List of number-ones

See also
1989 in music
List of number-one hits (Europe)

References

1989 record charts
Lists of number-one songs in Europe
Lists of number-one albums in Europe